Great Britain participated at the 2018 Summer Youth Olympics in Buenos Aires, Argentina from 6 October to 18 October 2018.

Archery

Great Britain qualified one archer based on its performance at the 2017 World Archery Youth Championships. Later, Great Britain qualified a male archer based on its performance at the 2018 European Youth Championships.

 Boys' Individual – Daniel Thompson
 Girls' Individual – Alyssia Tromans-Ansell
Individual

Team

Badminton

Great Britain qualified two players based on the Badminton Junior World Rankings. 

 Boys' singles – Christopher Grimley
 Girls' singles – Grace King
Singles

Team

Beach volleyball

Great Britain qualified a boys' team based on their performance at 2017–18 European Youth Continental Cup Final.

 Boys' tournament – Javier Bello and Joaquin Bello.

Boxing

Great Britain qualified three boxers based on their performance at the 2018 Youth European Confederation Boxing Championship.

 Boys' 52 kg – Ivan Hope Price
 Boys' 64 kg – Hassan Azim
 Boys' 81 kg – Karol Itauma
 Girls' 60 kg – Caroline Sara Dubois
Boys

Girl

Cycling

Great Britain qualified a boys' and girls' combined team based on its ranking in the Youth Olympic Games Junior Nation Rankings. They also qualified a mixed BMX racing team based on its ranking in the Youth Olympic Games BMX Junior Nation Rankings.

 Boys' combined team – Sean Flynn and Harry Birchill.
 Girls' combined team – Harriet Harnden and Anna McGorum.
 Mixed BMX racing team – Ross Cullen and Elissa Bradford

Diving

Great Britain qualified three divers at the 2018 World Junior Diving Championships.

 Boys' 3m Springboard – Antony Harding
  Boys' 10 Platform – Antony Harding  (not used)
 Girls' 3m Springboard – Maria Papworth

Equestrian

Great Britain qualified a rider based on its performance at the FEI European Junior Jumping Championships.

 Individual Jumping – Jack Whitaker

Golf

Great Britain have qualified a mixed team of one boy and one girl as a result of the World Amateur Golf Rankings as at 25 July 2018.

 Mixed team – Joe Pagdin and Lily May Humphreys.
Individual

Team

Gymnastics

Acrobatic
Great Britain qualified a mixed pair based on its performance at the 2018 Acrobatic Gymnastics World Championship.

 Mixed pair – Clyde Gembickas and Sophia Imrie-Gale.

Artistic
Great Britain qualified two gymnasts based on its performance at the 2018 European Junior Championship.

 Boys' artistic individual all-around – Adam Tobin
 Girls' artistic individual all-around – Amelie Morgan

Trampoline
Great Britain qualified two gymnasts based on its performance at the 2018 European Junior Championship.

 Boys' trampoline – Andrew Stamp
 Girls' trampoline – Jessica Clarke

Karate

Great Britain qualified one athlete based on the rankings in the Buenos Aires 2018 Olympic Standings. Later, they qualified a second athlete based on its performance at one of the Karate Qualification Tournaments.

 Girls' −59kg – Charlotte Hope
 Girls' +59kg – Lauren Salisbury

Modern pentathlon

Great Britain qualified one athlete based on its performance at the 2018 Youth A World Championship.

 Boys' Individual – Toby Price
 Girls' Individual – Annabel Denton

Rowing

Great Britain qualified two boats based on its performance at the 2017 World Junior Rowing Championships.

 Boys' pair – Michael Dalton and Theo Darlow.
 Girls' single sculls – Georgina Robinson Ranger

Sailing

Great Britain qualified two boats based on its performance at the 2017 World Techno 293+ Championships.

 Boys' Techno 293+ – Finn Hawkins
 Girls' Techno 293+ – Islay Watson

Shooting

Great Britain have received a wild card entry in the boy's air pistol event in the shooting competition.

 Boys' 10m Air Pistol – James Miller

Individual

Mixed

Taekwondo

Great Britain have qualified two athletes for the taekwondo competition via the qualification tournament.

 Boys' −55kg – Mason Yarrow
 Girls' −49kg – Aaliyah Powell
 Girls' +63kg  – Sharissa Gannaway

Triathlon

Great Britain qualified two athletes based on its performance at the 2018 European Youth Olympic Games Qualifier.

Individual

Relay

Weightlifting

References

2018 in British sport
Nations at the 2018 Summer Youth Olympics
Great Britain at the Youth Olympics